Camp Barkeley was a large United States Army training installation during World War II. The base was named after David B. Barkley, a Medal of Honor recipient during World War I (a clerical error is believed to have caused the spelling discrepancy).

Construction of the camp began in December 1940 and was completed in July 1941. Before it was finished, the 19,000 man 45th Infantry Division began to occupy the camp. Other units that trained at the camp include the 11th Armored Division, and the 12th Armored Division. The Medical Administrative Officer Candidate School was established at Barkeley in May 1942. In 1942, the Abilene Army Air Field opened nearby to train pilots. The field was renamed Dyess Air Force Base in 1956.

On February 1, 1944, the 1846th Unit POW Camp was activated at Camp Barkeley. At its peak, in March 1945, the POW camp housed 840 German prisoners.  According to Krammer, "the few escape attempts invariably found the German prisoners sleeping in the bandstand in Abilene's central park."

Camp Barkeley was officially closed in September 1945 and dismantled. The land, which was leased, reverted to the original landowners.

See also
List of World War II prisoner-of-war camps in the United States

References

Closed installations of the United States Army
Forts in Texas
Military facilities in Texas
Buildings and structures in Taylor County, Texas
Infrastructure completed in 1941
1941 establishments in Texas
1945 disestablishments in Texas